Czarków may refer to the following places in Poland:

Czarków, Gliwice County, Silesian Voivodeship
Czarków, Pszczyna County, Silesian Voivodeship
Nowy Czarków, Greater Poland Voivodeship